Kjell Kleven  is a Norwegian handball player and coach.

He made his debut on the Norwegian national team in 1960, 
and played 6 matches for the national team in 1960 and 1961. He participated at the 1961 World Men's Handball Championship.

Kleven was head coach for the Norway men's national handball team from 1965 to 1970.

References

Year of birth missing (living people)
Living people
Norwegian male handball players
Norwegian handball coaches